The Minister for Communications and the Media is a position in the Luxembourgian cabinet.  Among other competences, the Minister for Communications is responsible for overseeing the regulation of mail and of radio and television broadcasting and the apportionment of the radio spectrum.

Until 23 July 2009, the position was known as 'Minister for Communications'.

List of Ministers for Communications and the Media

Footnotes

References
 
  

 List
Communications, Minister for